Junggarsuchus is an extinct genus of sphenosuchian crocodylomorph from the Middle Jurassic of China. The type species is J. sloani.

Discovery 
Junggarsuchus was discovered in the Shishugou Formation in Xinjiang, China.

Description
Although the skull of Junggarsuchus shares many characteristics with those of modern crocodilians, it is morphologically intermediate between sphenosuchians and mesoeucrocodylians. As in other sphenosuchians, the limbs of Junggarsuchus were adapted to terrestrial locomotion (movement on land), rather than semi-aquatic locomotion seen in living crocodilians. These adaptations include: a vertically orientated upper arm bone, ball-and-socket shoulder joint, and a functionally tridactyl (three-fingered) hand.

References

External links

In Crocodile Evolution, the Bite Came Before the Body (article at National Geographic)

Middle Jurassic reptiles of Asia
Middle Jurassic crocodylomorphs
Jurassic China
Prehistoric pseudosuchian genera